The Norwegian Agrarian Association is the largest Norwegian interest organization for farmers.

It functions both as a labour union and as a trade union. It negotiates with the Norwegian Farmers and Smallholders Union and the Norwegian Ministry of Labour and Social Inclusion about agricultural subsidies. It has 61,000 members, with 607 local chapters and 18 county chapters.

The association was established in 1896 as Norges Landmandsforbund. In 1920 the organization decided to create its own political party, the Agrarian Party (now called Centre Party). In 1922 the Norwegian Agrarian Association took its present name. The organization is currently completely independent of the Centre Party.

The association has an official publication, Bondebladet, which is published on a weekly basis.

References

Trade unions in Norway
Employers' organisations in Norway
Agricultural organisations based in Norway
Organisations based in Oslo
Organizations established in 1896
Farmers' organizations
1896 establishments in Norway